Andrea Dahmen is a German actress of stage, radio and television.

She is the daughter of the actors Josef Dahmen and Gisela von Collande. She married Karlheinz Lemken with whom she had a daughter Julia Dahmen who also became an actress.

References

Bibliography
 Esther Pia Wipfler. Martin Luther in Motion Pictures: History of a Metamorphosis. Vandenhoeck & Ruprecht, 2011.

External links

1939 births
Living people
German television actresses
German stage actresses